Warrior of Rome, also known as , is a real-time strategy video game for the Sega Mega Drive/Genesis. The game is a fictional story about the adventures of Julius Caesar and the Roman army during his reign as general in the year 48 BCE. The game had a sequel, Warrior of Rome II.

Gameplay
The player had four maps (based in Egypt) to command their troops over. Players are given control over each unit of troops on the Section Map. The player can select six different options for each troop unit including approach speed, retreat to allow the unit to regain strength or setting traps. Once the troops have encountered an enemy unit, the Battle Screen appears showing a side shot of the player's troops in combat. The player can save their game progress or use a password system at the end of a completed stage.

Images

References

1991 video games
Sega Genesis games
Sega Genesis-only games
Real-time strategy video games
Video games set in Egypt
Warrior of Rome series
Multiplayer and single-player video games
Video games developed in Japan
Depictions of Julius Caesar in video games
Micronet co., Ltd. games